Acleris is a genus of moths belonging to the subfamily Tortricinae of the family Tortricidae. As of 2007, about 241 species were known.

Species

Acleris abietana (Hübner, [1819-1822])
Acleris aenigmana Powell, 1964
Acleris aestuosa Yasuda, 1965
Acleris affinatana (Snellen, 1883)
Acleris albicomana (Clemens, 1865) – red-edged acleris moth
Acleris albiscapulana (Christoph, 1881)
Acleris albopterana Liu & Bai, 1993
Acleris alnivora Oku, 1956
Acleris amurensis (Caradja, 1928)
Acleris arcticana (Guenee, 1845)
Acleris arcuata (Yasuda, 1975)
Acleris argyrograpta Razowski, 2003
Acleris askoldana (Christoph, 1881)
Acleris aspersana (Hübner, [1814-1817])
Acleris atayalicana Kawabe, 1989
Acleris atomophora Diakonoff, 1976
Acleris auricaput Razowski, 1971
Acleris aurichalcana (Bremer, 1865)
Acleris avicularia Razowski, 1964
Acleris bacurana (Turati, 1934)
Acleris baleina Razowski & Trematerra, 2010
Acleris bengalica Razowski, 1964
Acleris bergmanniana (Linnaeus, 1758) – yellow rose button moth
Acleris bicolor Kawabe, 1963
Acleris blanda (Yasuda, 1975)
Acleris boscana (Fabricius, 1794)
Acleris boscanoides Razowski, 1959
Acleris bowmanana (McDunnough, 1934)
Acleris braunana (McDunnough, 1934)
Acleris britannia Kearfott, 1904 – Brittania moth
Acleris bununa Kawabe, 1989
Acleris busckana (McDunnough, 1934)
Acleris caerulescens (Walsingham, 1900)
Acleris caledoniana (Stephens, 1852)
Acleris caliginosana (Walker, 1863)
Acleris cameroonana Razowski, 2012
Acleris capizziana Obraztsov, 1963
Acleris caucasica (Filipjev, 1962)
Acleris celiana (Robinson, 1869)
Acleris cervinana (Fernald, 1882)
Acleris chalybeana (Fernald, 1882) – lesser maple leafroller moth
Acleris chionocentra (Meyrick, 1908)
Acleris chloroma Razowski, 1993
Acleris clarkei Obraztsov, 1963
Acleris comandrana (Fernald, 1892)
Acleris comariana (Lienig & Zeller, 1846) – strawberry tortrix moth
Acleris compsoptila (Meyrick, 1923)
Acleris conchyloides (Walsingham, 1900)
Acleris coniferarum (Filipjev, 1962)
Acleris cornana (McDunnough, 1933)
Acleris crassa Razowski & Yasuda, 1964
Acleris crataegi (Kuznetzov, 1964)
Acleris cribellata Falkovitsh, 1965
Acleris cristana ([Denis & Schiffermüller], 1775) – rufous-margined button moth 
Acleris curvalana (Kearfott, 1907) – blueberry leaftier moth
Acleris dealbata (Yasuda, 1975)
Acleris decolorata Razowski, 1964
Acleris delicata (Yasuda & Kawabe, 1980)
Acleris delicatana (Christoph, 1881)
Acleris dentata (Razowski, 1966)
Acleris denticulosa Diakonoff, 1976
Acleris diadecta Razowski, 2003
Acleris diaphora Razowski, 2003
Acleris dispar (Liu & Bai, 1987)
Acleris dryochyta (Meyrick in Caradja & Meyrick, 1937)
Acleris duoloba Razowski, 2003
Acleris duracina Razowski, 1974
Acleris effractana (Hübner, 1799) – hook-winged tortrix moth
Acleris elaearcha (Meyrick, 1908)
Acleris elegans Oku, 1956
Acleris emargana (Fabricius, 1775) – notched-winged tortrix moth 
Acleris emera Razowski, 1993
Acleris enitescens (Meyrick, 1912)
Acleris expressa (Filipjev, 1931)
Acleris exsucana (Kennel, 1901)
Acleris extensana (Walker, 1863)
Acleris extranea Razowski, 1975
Acleris ferox (Razowski, 1975)
Acleris ferrugana ([Denis & Schiffermüller], 1775)
Acleris filipjevi Obraztsov, 1956
Acleris fimbriana (Thunberg & Becklin, 1791) – yellow tortrix moth
Acleris fistularis Diakonoff, 1976
Acleris flavivittana (Clemens, 1864) – multiform leafroller moth
Acleris flavopterana Liu & Bai, 1993
Acleris foliana (Walsingham, 1879)
Acleris forbesana (McDunnough, 1934) – Forbes' acleris moth
Acleris formosae Razowski, 1964
Acleris forsskaleana (Linnaeus, 1758) – maple leaftier moth
Acleris fragariana Kearfott, 1904
Acleris fuscana  – small aspen leaftier moth
Acleris fuscopterana Liu & Bai, 1993
Acleris fuscopunctata (Liu & Bai, 1987)
Acleris fuscotogata (Walsingham, 1900)
Acleris ganeshia Razowski, 2012
Acleris gatesclarkei Kawabe, 1992
Acleris gibbopterana Liu & Bai, 1993
Acleris glaucomis (Meyrick, 1908)
Acleris gloverana (Walsingham, 1879) – western black-headed budworm moth 
Acleris gobica Kuznetzov, 1975
Acleris gothena Razowski, 2012
Acleris griseopterana Liu & Bai, 1993
Acleris hapalactis (Meyrick, 1912)
Acleris harenna Razowski & Trematerra, 2010
Acleris hastiana (Linnaeus, 1758)
Acleris helvolaris (Liu & Bai, 1987)
Acleris hippophaeana (Heyden, 1865)
Acleris hispidana (Christoph, 1881)
Acleris hohuanshana Kawabe, 1989
Acleris hokkaidana Razowski & Yasuda, 1964
Acleris holmiana (Linnaeus, 1758) – golden leafroller moth
Acleris hudsoniana (Walker, 1863)
Acleris hyemana (Haworth, [1811])
Acleris idonea Razowski, 1972
Acleris imitatrix (Razowski, 1975)
Acleris implexana (Walker, 1863)
Acleris inana (Robinson, 1869)
Acleris incognita Obraztsov, 1963
Acleris indignana (Christoph, 1881)
Acleris issikii Oku, 1957
Acleris japonica (Walsingham, 1900)
Acleris kearfottana (McDunnough, 1934)
Acleris keiferi Powell, 1964
Acleris kerincina Razowski, 2012
Acleris kinangopana Razowski, 1964
Acleris klotsi Obraztsov, 1963
Acleris kochiella (Goeze, 1783)
Acleris kodamai Yasuda, 1965
Acleris kuznetzovi Razowski, 1989
Acleris lacordairana (Duponchel, in Godart, 1836)
Acleris laterana (Fabricius, 1794)
Acleris leechi (Walsingham, 1900)
Acleris lipsiana ([Denis & Schiffermüller], 1775)
Acleris literana (Linnaeus, 1758) – sprinkled rough-wing moth 
Acleris logiana (Clerck, 1759) – black-headed birch leaffolder moth
Acleris longipalpana (Snellen, 1883)
Acleris lorquiniana (Duponchel, in Godart, 1835)
Acleris loxoscia (Meyrick, 1907)
Acleris lucipara Razowski, 1964
Acleris lucipeta Razowski, 1966
Acleris luoyingensis Kawabe, 1992
Acleris lutescentis (Liu & Bai, 1987)
Acleris maccana (Treitschke, 1835) – marbled dog’s-tooth tortrix 
Acleris macdunnoughi Obraztsov, 1963
Acleris macropterana Liu & Bai, 1993
Acleris maculidorsana (Clemens, 1864) – stained-back leafroller moth
Acleris maculopterana Liu & Bai, 1993
Acleris malagassana Diakonoff, 1973
Acleris matthewsi Razowski, 1986
Acleris maximana (Barnes & Busck, 1920)
Acleris medea Diakonoff, 1976
Acleris micropterana Liu & Bai, 1993
Acleris minuta (Robinson, 1869) – yellow-headed fireworm moth
Acleris monagma Diakonoff, 1976
Acleris mundana Kuznetzov, 1979
Acleris nakajimai Kawabe, 1992
Acleris napaea (Meyrick, 1912)
Acleris nectaritis (Meyrick, 1912)
Acleris negundana (Busck, 1940) – speckled acleris moth
Acleris nigrilineana Kawabe, 1963
Acleris nigriradix (Filipjev, 1931)
Acleris nigrolinea (Robinson, 1869)
Acleris nigropterana Liu & Bai, 1993
Acleris nishidai J.W.Brown, 2008
Acleris nivisellana (Walsingham, 1879) – snowy-shouldered acleris moth
Acleris notana (Donovan, [1806])
Acleris obligatoria Park & Razowski, 1991
Acleris obtusana (Eversmann, 1844)
Acleris ochropicta Razowski, 1975
Acleris ochropterana Liu & Bai, 1993
Acleris okanagana (McDunnough, 1940)
Acleris ophthalmicana Razowski & Yasuda, 1964
Acleris orphnocycla (Meyrick in Caradja & Meyrick, 1937)
Acleris osthelderi (Obraztsov, 1949)
Acleris oxycoccana (Packard, 1869)
Acleris pallidorbis Diakonoff, 1976
Acleris paracinderella Powell, 1964
Acleris paradiseana (Walsingham, 1900)
Acleris perfundana Kuznetzov, 1962
Acleris permutana (Duponchel, in Godart, 1836)
Acleris phalera (Kuznetzov, 1964)
Acleris phanerocrypta Diakonoff, 1973
Acleris phantastica Razowski & Yasuda, 1964
Acleris phyllosocia Razowski, 2008
Acleris placata (Meyrick, 1912)
Acleris placidus Yasuda & Kawabe, 1980
Acleris platynotana (Walsingham, 1900)
Acleris porphyrocentra (Meyrick in Caradja & Meyrick, 1937)
Acleris potosiana Razowski & Becker, 2003
Acleris praeterita Park & Razowski, 1991
Acleris proximana (Caradja, 1927)
Acleris ptychogrammos (Zeller, 1875)
Acleris pulchella Kawabe, 1963
Acleris pulcherrima Razowski, 1971
Acleris quadridentana (Walsingham, 1900)
Acleris quercinana (Zeller, 1849)
Acleris rantaizana Razowski, 1966
Acleris razowskii (Yasuda, 1975)
Acleris recula Razowski, 1974
Acleris retrusa Razowski, 1993
Acleris rhombana ([Denis & Schiffermüller], 1775) – rhomboid tortrix moth
Acleris robinsoniana (Forbes, 1923) – Robinson's acleris moth
Acleris roscidana (Hübner, [1796-1799])
Acleris rosella (Liu & Bai, 1987)
Acleris roxana Razowski & Yasuda, 1964
Acleris rubi Razowski, 2005
Acleris rubivorella (Filipjev, 1962)
Acleris rufana ([Denis & Schiffermüller], 1775)
Acleris ruwenzorica Razowski, 2005
Acleris sagmatias (Meyrick, 1905)
Acleris salicicola Kuznetzov, 1970
Acleris santacrucis Obraztsov, 1963
Acleris scabrana ([Denis & Schiffermüller], 1775) – gray rough-wing moth
Acleris schalleriana (Linnaeus, 1761) – Schaller's acleris moth
Acleris schiasma Razowski, 2012
Acleris semiannula (Robinson, 1869)
Acleris semipurpurana (Kearfott, 1905) – oak leaftier moth
Acleris semitexta (Meyrick, 1912)
Acleris senescens (Zeller, 1874)
Acleris shepherdana (Stephens, 1852)
Acleris similis (Filipjev, 1931)
Acleris simpliciana (Walsingham, 1879)
Acleris sinica (Razowski, 1966)
Acleris sinuopterana Liu & Bai, 1993
Acleris sinuosaria Razowski, 1964
Acleris sordidata Razowski, 1971
Acleris sparsana ([Denis & Schiffermüller], 1775)
Acleris stachi (Razowski, 1953)
Acleris stadiana (Barnes & Busck, 1920)
Acleris stibiana (Snellen, 1883)
Acleris strigifera (Filipjev, 1931)
Acleris submaccana (Filipjev, 1962)
Acleris subnivana (Walker, 1863)
Acleris supernova Razowski & Wojtusiak, 2009
Acleris tabida Razowski, 1975
Acleris taiwana Kawabe, 1992
Acleris takeuchii Razowski & Yasuda, 1964
Acleris thiana Razowski, 1966
Acleris thomasi Razowski, 1990
Acleris thylacitis (Meyrick, 1920)
Acleris tibetica Razowski, 1964
Acleris tigricolor (Walsingham, 1900)
Acleris tremewani Razowski, 1964
Acleris trujilloana Razowski & Wojtusiak, 2013
Acleris tsuifengana Kawabe, 1992
Acleris tungurahuae Razowski & Wojtusiak, 2009
Acleris tunicatana (Walsingham, 1900)
Acleris ulmicola (Meyrick, 1930)
Acleris umbrana (Hübner, [1796-1799])
Acleris undulana (Walsingham, 1900) – cedar leaf moth
Acleris uniformis (Filipjev, 1931)
Acleris variana (Fernald, in Packard, 1886) – eastern black-headed budworm moth
Acleris variegana ([Denis & Schiffermüller], 1775) – garden rose tortrix moth, fruit tortrix moth 
Acleris venatana Kawabe, 1992
Acleris yasudai Razowski, 1966
Acleris yasutoshii Kawabe, 1985
Acleris youngana (McDunnough, 1934)
Acleris zeta Razowski, 1964
Acleris zimmermani Clarke in Zimmerman, 1978

Former species
Acleris ferrumixtana (Benander, 1934)
Acleris placidana (Robinson, 1869)

See also
List of Tortricidae genera

References

 , 2005: World catalogue of insects volume 5 Tortricidae.
 , 1816, Verz. bekannter Schmett.: 384.
 , 1985: Notes on the Tortricidae (Lepidoptera) from Taiwan, 1. Tinea 12 (1): 1-10.
 , 1992: Notes on the Tortricidae (Lepidoptera) from Taiwan, 4. Tinea 13 (17): 171-181.
 , 1987: On the Chinese Croesia Hübner (Lepidoptera: Tortricidae) with descriptions of five new species. Acta Entomologica Sinica 30 (3): 313-320.
 , 1993: Studies on the Acleris Hübner and description of new species in China. (Lepidoptera: Tortricidae). Sinozoologia 10: 297-318. Full article: .
 , 2012: Tortricines in the fauna of Nepal (Lepidoptera: Tortricidae). Polish Journal of Entomology 81 (1): 91-99. Full article: .
 , 2012: Tortricidae (Lepidoptera) from the Tervuren Museum: 1. Tortricini and Chlidanotini. Polish Journal of Entomology 81 (2): 129-143. Abstract and full article: .
 , 2010:  Tortricidae (Lepidoptera) from Ethiopia Journal of Entomological and Acarological Research Serie II, 42 (2): 47-79. Abstract: .
 , 2009: Tortricidae (Lepidoptera) from the mountains of Ecuador and remarks on their geographical distribution. Part IV. Eastern Cordillera. Acta Zoologica Cracoviensia 51B (1-2): 119-187. doi:10.3409/azc.52b_1-2.119-187. Full article: .
 , 2013: Accessions to the fauna of Neotropical Tortricidae (Lepidoptera). Acta Zoologica Cracoviensia, 56 (1): 9-40. Full article: .

External links
 tortricidae.com

 
Tortricidae genera
Taxa named by Jacob Hübner